Edijs is a Latvian masculine given name. Edijs is often also a diminutive of the given names Edgars, Eduards, Edmunds, and Edvīns. People bearing the name Edijs include:

Edijs Brahmanis (born 1983), ice hockey player
Edijs Jurēvics (born 1989), rock singer and musician with the band Crow Mother
Edijs Rinke-Leitāns (born 1991), ice hockey player

References

Latvian masculine given names
Masculine given names